The 1977 Rice Owls football team was an American football team that represented Rice University in the Southwest Conference during the 1977 NCAA Division I football season. In their second year under head coach Homer Rice, the team compiled a 1–10 record. 

Coach Rice departed following the season to become head coach of the National Football League's Cincinnati Bengals.

Schedule

References

Rice
Rice Owls football seasons
Rice Owls football